The 2022–23 Louisiana Ragin' Cajuns men's basketball team represented the University of Louisiana at Lafayette during the 2022–23 NCAA Division I men's basketball season. The Ragin' Cajuns, led by 13th-year head coach Bob Marlin, played their home games at the Cajundome as members of the Sun Belt Conference.

Previous season
The Ragin' Cajuns finished the 2021–22 season 16–15, 8–9 in Sun Belt play to finish eighth in place. They defeated UT Arlington, Texas State and Troy to advanced to the championship where they lost to Georgia State of the Sun Belt tournament.

Offseason

Departures

Transfers

Recruiting

Preseason

Preseason Sun Belt Conference poll 
The Ragin' Cajuns were picked to win the conference in the conference's preseason poll; they received 10 of 14 first-place votes. Junior forward Jordan Brown was named the preseason player of the year. Sophomore forward Kobe Julien was named to the preseason All-SBC Second Team.

Roster

Schedule and results

|-
!colspan=12 style=| Non-conference regular season

|-
!colspan=12 style=| Sun Belt Conference regular season

|-
!colspan=9 style=| Sun Belt tournament

|-
!colspan=12 style=| NCAA Tournament

References 

Louisiana Ragin' Cajuns men's basketball seasons
Louisiana-Lafayette
Louisiana
Louisiana
Louisiana